The 2015–16 Philippine National Games was a national multi-sport event. A series of smaller multi-sport events were held in three separate venues and legs in Luzon, Visayas, and Mindanao. Some sports also served as qualifying events for National Finals to be hosted by the province of Pangasinan from March 7–11, 2016.

Events

Sports
There are 10 sports events which also served as qualifiers for the finals to be held in 2016 which were held in all three legs of the games. Only athletes from the hosting region are eligible to participate in these qualifying events. (e.g. Athletes from Luzon can only participate in the Luzon leg, and so on). The other events can be participated by athletes from any region. The non-qualifying events were scattered across the three legs with the Luzon leg hosting most number of events.

References

2015 in Philippine sport
2016 in Philippine sport
Philippine National Games
Sports in Metro Manila
Sports in Zamboanga del Sur
Sports in Antique (province)
Sports in Pangasinan